The Arellano University School of Law (AUSL) is the law school of Arellano University. AUSL was established in 1938, making it one of the oldest law schools in the Philippines. The school is managed by the Arellano Law Foundation, a non-stock and non-profit organization established by the alumni and faculty members of AU in 1979. AUSL is considered a model institution by the Commission on Higher Education for providing quality education and producing successful graduates. Since 2000, the school has operated Lawphil, an online repository of Philippine jurisprudence, statutes, executive orders, and similar documents.

Notable people

References

External links 
 
 Arellano University - School of Law - Official website

Arellano University
1938 establishments in the Philippines
Educational institutions established in 1938
Law schools in the Philippines